The 2013–14 Southern Professional Hockey League season is the 10th season of the Southern Professional Hockey League (SPHL).  The Pensacola Ice Flyers defeated the Columbus Cottonmouths in the President's Cup final 2 games to none to repeat as winners of the President's Cup.

Preseason
The Augusta RiverHawks have suspended operations for the 2013-14 season due to failure of the ice system at the James Brown Arena. Team officials, the city of Augusta, and Global Spectrum could not reach an agreement on repairing or replacing the JBA's ice system in time for the club to commit to the forthcoming season.

On May 15, 2013, it was announced that the CHL's Bloomington Thunder (formerly known as the Blaze), along with the AHL's Peoria Rivermen, would move to the Southern Professional Hockey League for the 2013–14 season. The Rivermen had been notified that the Vancouver Canucks, who had purchased the team a month earlier, would not keep them in Peoria. The two teams will reportedly be owned by two former Rivermen executives, John Butler, Bart Rogers and David Holt with financial backing from former Rivermen owner Bruce Saurs.

Regular season

Standings

‡ William B. Coffey Trophy winners
 Advanced to playoffs

After games of March 22, 2014

Attendance

After games of March 22, 2014

President's Cup playoffs

* indicates overtime period.

Finals
All times are local (EDT/CDT)

Awards
The SPHL All-Rookie team was announced on March 26, 2014, the All-SPHL teams on March 27, 2014, the Easton Defensemen of the Year on March 28, 2014, the Easton Rookie of the Year on March 31, 2014, the Sher-Wood Goaltender of the Year on April 1, 2014, the Easton Coach of the Year on April 2, 2014, and the Easton Most Valuable Player on April 3, 2014.

All-SPHL selections

References

Southern Professional Hockey League seasons
Sphl